Davie Mason (born April 3, 1984) is a former Canadian football running back. He went undrafted in the 2009 CFL Draft. He played CIS football for the Ottawa Gee-Gees.

External links
Ottawa Gee-Gees bio

1984 births
Living people
Players of Canadian football from Ontario
Canadian football running backs
Ottawa Gee-Gees football players